Acacia floydii is a shrub belonging to the genus Acacia and the subgenus Phyllodineae that is native to parts of eastern Australia.

Description
It has sharply angled glabrous branchlets that become flattened at extremities. It has bipinnate leaves on juvenile plants that are sometimes present on mature plants.

Taxonomy
The specific epithet honours Alexander 'Alex' Geoffrey Floyd, who once worked at New South Wales National Parks and Wildlife Service.

Distribution
It is found along the east coast of northern New South Wales and southern Queensland where it is found on the escarpment range east and north of Tenterfield on granite outcrops or near creeks as a part of wet sclerophyll forest or along the margins of rainforest communities.

See also
 List of Acacia species

References

floydii
Flora of Queensland
Flora of New South Wales
Plants described in 1980